Shinobi: Heart Under Blade is a 2005 Japanese romantic drama film directed by Ten Shimoyama and written by Kenya Hirata. It is an adaptation of Futaro Yamada's novel The Kouga Ninja Scrolls, although the characters are highly altered. It depicts the clash between two ninja clans, Iga and Kouga, and the fated love between Gennosuke (Kouga) and Oboro (Iga). The film's theme song was "Heaven" by Ayumi Hamasaki.

The film was released by Shochiku on September 15, 2005. On February 6, 2007, Funimation released the film on home video in the North America. The contents of the DVD is a 2-Disc Set with the main movie available in Japanese and an English dub. The 2nd Disc contains Special Features and making-ofs. All of the films are subtitled in English.

Plot 
Set immediately after the Japanese Sengoku period, Iga and Kouga, two mercenary clans have been waging a vendetta against each other over hundreds of years. Around 1614, Tokugawa Ieyasu, the ruler of Japan and the founder of the Tokugawa Shogunate, perceives the threat posed by the two clans. Attempting to consolidate his reign, he deliberately stirs up their feud by inviting the clans to choose their five best warriors to fight to the death. Designated as the leaders of the two clans respectively, Kouga Gennosuke (Joe Odagiri) and Oboro (Yukie Nakama), who have secretly married, are unwillingly embroiled in the political plot. Hence, they have to make a difficult decision.

Initially, being peaceful and knowing the preciousness of life, they try their utmost to prevent this meaningless and brutal fight by questioning the shogunate's motives. After the deaths of all their comrades, however, they gradually accept their fate. In the last fight, Kouga Gennosuke chooses not to defend himself and allows his lover Oboro to kill him, thus letting the clan of Iga "win". Meanwhile, Ieyasu sends his armies to exterminate the ninja villages. To accomplish Gennosuke's hope of saving them, Oboro implores Tokugawa Ieyasu not to destroy the villages and, as a show of her sincerity, blinds herself, thereby destroying her most powerful weapons, her eyes (which possess a deadly technique called . Moved profoundly by Oboro, Ieyasu withdraws his armies and issues an injunction to protect the ninja villages. For generations hence, the villages live peacefully.

Cast
The list of six top ninja of Iga and Kouga, along with other characters.

Kouga
Joe Odagiri as Kouga Gennosuke - the Kouga leader with the power to see, react, and move at very high speeds.
Takeshi Masu as Muroga Hyouma - has abilities similar to a 6th sense (seeing enemies kilometers away).
Mitsuki Koga as Chikuma Koshirou - no supernatural powers, best weapons user.
Tomoka Kurotani as Kagero - poison specialist. Poison flows within her veins and she is able to breathe poison at enemies or poisoning them with a kiss.
Houka Kinoshita as Kisaragi Saemon - he is able to assume the physical appearance of others and imitate their voice.
Minoru Terada as Kouga Danjo

Iga
Yukie Nakama as Oboro - the Iga leader who has the "eyes of destruction", completely incapacitating an opponent with one glance.
Kippei Shiina as Yakushiji Tenzen - he is the host to parasitic worms which prevent him from aging and heal any wounds he sustained, allowing him to quickly recover from nearly any injury.
Tak Sakaguchi as Yashamaru - he manipulates thin wires, using them like whips.  The wires are also sharp enough to cut through various objects.
Shun Ito as Mino Nenki - beastman that has a keen sense of smell
Erika Sawajiri as Hotarubi - she uses some sort of dust that manipulates butterflies and moths.
Lily as Ogen

Others
Takeshi Masu as Kuroga Hyouma
Masaki Nishina as Yagyū Jūbei Mitsuyoshi
Toshiya Nagasawa as Yagyū Munenori
Yutaka Matsushige as Hattori Hanzō
Renji Ishibashi as Nankōbō Tenkai
Kazuo Kitamura as Tokugawa Ieyasu

Reception

The film was successful financially in Japan earning roughly 11 million US dollars. Shinobi won both best actor and best new actress awards at both the Kinema Junpo Awards and Yokohama Film Festival.

References

 "Shinobi: Heart Under Blade". (January 2007) Newtype USA. Vol. 6 No. 1 p. 23.

External links 
 
 
 

2000s adventure films
2005 films
Films directed by Ten Shimoyama
Films scored by Taro Iwashiro
Funimation
2000s Japanese-language films
Ninja films
2005 romantic drama films
Shochiku films
Japanese martial arts films
Cultural depictions of Hattori Hanzō
2005 martial arts films
2000s Japanese films

ja:甲賀忍法帖#映画